Elephantopus scaber is a tropical species of flowering plant in the sunflower family.  It is native to tropical Africa, Eastern Asia, Indian Subcontinent, Southeast Asia, and northern Australia. It has become naturalized in tropical Africa and Latin America. Its natural habitat is subtropical or tropical moist montane forests.

Uses
Elephantopus scaber is used as a traditional medicine. Different parts of the plant are used in traditional medicine of India as an astringent agent, cardiac tonic, and diuretic, and is used for eczema, rheumatism, fever, and bladder stones. E.scaber modulates inflammatory responses by inhibiting the production of TNFα and IL-1β.

Chemical constituents
Elephantopus scaber contains elephantopin which is a germacranolide sesquiterpene lactone containing two lactone rings and an epoxide functional group. 17,19-Dihydrodeoxyelephantopin, iso-17,19- dihydro-deoxy elephantopin and 8-hydroxyl
naringenin are the most important bioactive compounds responsible for anti-bacterial activity. By UPLC MS Q-TOF, 34 components were identified.

Subspecies and varieties
Varieties of E. scaber include:
Elephantopus scaber subsp. plurisetus (O.Hoffm.) Philipson
Elephantopus scaber subsp. scaber
Elephantopus scaber var. scaber
Elephantopus scaber var. sinuatus (Mor.) Miq.

References

Vernonieae
Plants described in 1753
Taxa named by Carl Linnaeus
Flora of Asia
Flora of Australia
Medicinal plants